Sir William Arthur Lewis (23 January 1915 – 15 June 1991) was a Saint Lucian  economist at the James Madison Professor of Political Economy at Princeton University. Lewis was known for his contributions in the field of economic development. In 1979, he was awarded the Nobel Memorial Prize in Economic Sciences.

Biography
Arthur Lewis was born in Saint Lucia, then still part of the British Windward Islands federal colony, the fourth of the five sons of George Ferdinand and Ida Lewis (the others being Stanley, Earl, Allen and Victor). His parents had migrated from Antigua shortly after the turn of the century. George Lewis died when Arthur was seven years old and his brothers aged from five to 17, leaving Ida to raise her five children alone. Arthur was a gifted student and was promoted two classes ahead of his age. After finishing school when he was 14 years old, Lewis worked as a clerk, while waiting to be old enough to sit the examination for a government scholarship to a British university, which would be in 1932. During this time he began a lifelong friendship with Eric Williams, the future first prime minister of Trinidad and Tobago.

Lewis's initial career choice was to become an engineer, "but this seemed pointless since neither the government nor the white firms would employ a black engineer," as he later said: "Eventually I decided to study business administration, planning to return to St. Lucia for a job in the municipal service or in private trade. I would simultaneously study law to fall back on if nothing administrative turned up." At the age of 18, he earned the government scholarship to attend the London School of Economics (LSE), becoming the first black individual to gain acceptance there. While enrolled to study for a Bachelor of Commerce degree ("which offered accounting, business management, commercial law and a little economics and statistics") in 1933, he would achieve similar success as he did at grade school. Lewis's academic superiority was noticed and admired by his peers and professors. While at LSE, he had the opportunity to study under the likes of John Hicks, Arnold Plant, Lionel Robbins, and Friedrich Hayek.

After Lewis graduated in 1937 with first-class honours, LSE gave him a scholarship to read for a PhD in industrial economics, under the supervision of Arnold Plant. Lewis would become the first black faculty member at LSE: in 1938 he was given a teaching appointment, and in 1939 was made an Assistant Lecturer, continuing to work as a member of the LSE staff until 1948.

In 1947, Lewis married Gladys Jacobs, and that year he was selected as a lecturer at the Victoria University of Manchester, and moved there with his family, becoming Britain's first black lecturer. In 1948, at the age of 33, he was made a full professor. He taught at Manchester until 1957. During this period, he developed some of his most important concepts about the patterns of capital and wages in developing countries. He particularly became known for his contributions to development economics, of great interest as former colonies began to gain independence from their European colonizers.

Lewis served as an economic advisor to numerous African and Caribbean governments, including Nigeria, Ghana, Trinidad and Tobago, Jamaica, and Barbados. When Ghana (where in 1929 his eldest brother Stanley had settled) gained independence in 1957, Lewis was appointed as the country's first economic advisor. He helped draw up its first Five-Year Development Plan (1959–1963).

In 1959 Lewis returned to the Caribbean region when appointed Vice Chancellor of the University of the West Indies. He was elected to the American Academy of Arts and Sciences in 1962. In 1963 he was knighted by the British government for his achievements and for his contributions to economics. That year, he was also appointed Professor of Public and International Affairs at Princeton University – the first black instructor to be given a full professorship – and subsequently held the position of James Madison Professor of Political Economics. In 1966, he was elected to the American Philosophical Society. He also served from 1966 to 1973 he served as Chancellor of the University of Guyana. Lewis worked at Princeton for the next two decades, teaching generations of students until his retirement in 1983. Lewis helped to establish / the Caribbean Development Bank and in 1970 he was selected as its first president, serving in that capacity until 1973.

Lewis received the Nobel Prize in Economics in 1979, sharing it with Theodore Schultz, "for their pioneering research into economic development research with particular consideration of the problems of developing countries".

Lewis died on 15 June 1991 in Bridgetown, Barbados. He was buried in the grounds of the St. Lucian community college named in his honour.

Personal life
In 1947, Lewis married Grenada-born Gladys Jacobs, with whom he had two daughters, Elizabeth and Barbara.

Key works

Labour in the West Indies: The Birth of a Workers' Movement (1939)
Labour in the West Indies: The Birth of a Worker's Movement, first published by the Fabian Society in 1939, was an account of the 1930s labour movement in the Caribbean. It remained the only work published on the Caribbean-wide movement and the Labour Rebellions in the English-speaking Caribbean for decades. The book was republished by John La Rose and Sarah White at New Beacon Books in February 1978. Lewis is now characterised as "among the earliest proponents of Reparations for the former West Indies for Britain's colonial wrongs" because of the ideas he put forward in this work.

The "Lewis model"

Lewis published in 1954 what was to be his most influential development economics article, "Economic Development with Unlimited Supplies of Labour" (Manchester School). In this publication, he introduced what came to be called the dual sector model, or the "Lewis model".

Lewis combined an analysis of the historical experience of developed countries with the central ideas of the classical economists to produce a broad picture of the development process. In his theory, a "capitalist" sector develops by taking labour from a non-capitalist backward "subsistence" sector. The subsistence sector is governed by informal institutions and social norms so that producers do not maximize profits and workers can be paid above their marginal product. At an early stage of development, the "unlimited" supply of labour from the subsistence economy means that the capitalist sector can expand for some time without the need to raise wages.  This results in higher returns to capital, which are reinvested in capital accumulation. In turn, the increase in the capital stock leads the "capitalists" to expand employment by drawing further labour from the subsistence sector. Given the assumptions of the model (for example, that the profits are reinvested and that capital accumulation does not substitute for skilled labour in production), the process becomes self-sustaining and leads to modernization and economic development.

The point at which the excess labour in the subsistence sector is fully absorbed into the modern sector, and where further capital accumulation begins to push the balance of power towards labour (thus increasing wages) in both capitalist and subsistence sectors, is sometimes called the Lewisian turning point. It has recently been widely discussed in the context of economic development in China. Work building on Lewis's analysis has shown that productivity gains in the areas formerly occupied by the subsistence sector (e.g. agriculture) can offset some of the labour demand.

The Theory of Economic Growth (1955)
In his 1955 book, The Theory of Economic Growth, Lewis sought to "provide an appropriate framework for studying economic development", driven by a combination of "curiosity and of practical need."

During the Industrial Revolution, England was experiencing the worst economic turmoil of its time. It would not be until an economic enlightenment took place that cities began to shift towards factories and labour-intensive methods of production as they experienced giant shifts in the labour and agriculture markets, thus, eventually leading to higher production, and higher income. Lewis theorized if England could turn its misfortune around, the same could be done for developing countries around the world. His theories proved true for some countries such as Nigeria and Barbados, as they would see some economic development.

Selected bibliography 
 Labour in the West Indies: The Birth of a Workers' Movement (1939)
 The Principles of Economic Planning (1949)
 The Theory of Economic Growth (1955)
 Development Planning (1966)
 Tropical Development 1880–1913 (1971)
 Growth and Fluctuations 1870–1913 (1978)

Selected awards and honours 
 1963: Knighthood for contributions to economics.
 1979: Nobel Prize in Economics

Legacy 

 The Sir Arthur Lewis Community College, St. Lucia, was named in his honour.
 The Arthur Lewis Building (opened in 2007) at the University of Manchester was named for him, as he had lectured there for several years before entering governmental positions.
 The Arthur Lewis Lectures are held annually at the University of Manchester, having begun in 2015, the centenary of his birth.
 He is commemorated by the Sir Arthur Lewis Institute of Social and Economic Studies (SALISES) on the three campuses of The University of the West Indies.
 Sir Arthur Lewis's portrait appears on the Eastern Caribbean 100-dollar bill.
 Arthur Lewis Auditorium, the main auditorium of Robertson Hall, home of the Princeton School of Public and International Affairs at Princeton University, was named after him.
 On 10 December 2020, the 41st anniversary of his receiving the Nobel Prize, Google celebrated the late Sir Arthur Lewis with a Google Doodle.

See also
 Black Nobel Prize laureates

References

Citations

Sources 

 Biography at stlucianobellaureates.org
 Biography on the Sir Arthur Lewis Community College website
 Breit, William, and Barry T. Hirsch (eds., 2004). Lives of the Laureates (4th edn). Cambridge, Mass: The MIT Press. .
  453 pp.

Further reading
 Figueroa, M. (December 2005). "W. Arthur Lewis's Social Analysis and the Transformation of Tropical Economies". Social and Economic Studies, 54(4), 72–90. .

External links

 Arthur Lewis Papers at the Seeley G. Mudd Manuscript Library, Princeton University
 Saint Lucian Nobel Laureates 
 Biography available in Nobel Laureates of Saint Lucia
 
 Sir Arthur Lewis Community College, Saint Lucia
 Sir Arthur Lewis – Nobel Prize Lecture
 IDEAS/RePEc
 
 The Lewisian Turning Point and Its Implications to Labor Protection (The Institute of Population and Labor Economics, Chinese Academy of Social Sciences)
 
 

1915 births
1991 deaths
20th-century American economists
Academics of the London School of Economics
Academics of the Victoria University of Manchester
African-American economists
Alumni of the London School of Economics
Corresponding Fellows of the British Academy
Development economists
Distinguished Fellows of the American Economic Association
Heads of the University of the West Indies
Knights Bachelor
Nobel laureates in Economics
People from Castries Quarter
Presidents of the American Economic Association
Princeton University faculty
Saint Lucian economists
Saint Lucian expatriates in the United Kingdom
Saint Lucian expatriates in the United States
Saint Lucian Nobel laureates
Saint Lucian people of African descent
Saint Lucian people of Antigua and Barbuda descent
Members of the American Philosophical Society